USCGC Stone (WMSL-758) is the ninth  of the United States Coast Guard and is expected to be stationed in Charleston, South Carolina.

Development and design 

All of Legend-class cutters were constructed by Huntington Ingalls Industries and were part of the Integrated Deepwater System Program. They are of the high endurance cutter roles with additional upgrades to make it more of an asset to the Department of Defense during declared national emergency contingencies. The cutters are armed mainly to take on lightly-armed hostiles in Low-Threat Environments.

Construction and career 
Stone was laid down on 14 September 2018, launched on 4 October 2019 by Huntington Ingalls Industries and christened on 29 February 2020. She will be expected to be commissioned in February 2021. Her sea trials took place on 15 September in the Gulf of Mexico and was successfully delivered to the Coast Guard on 10 November 2020.

On 22 December 2020, she left Pascagoula, Mississippi for her first patrol, which was also her shakedown cruise, in the South Atlantic. While in the South Atlantic, she participated Operation Southern Cross which is designed to counter illegal, unregulated, and unreported fishing along with strengthening partnerships throughout the region. On January 29, 2021, it was announced that the Stone would not make her scheduled stop in Argentina after visiting Guyana, Brazil, and Uruguay. The crew did not disembark in Montevideo, due to concerns about the COVID-19 pandemic. Before returning home, while off the coast of Guyana she helped to interdict a suspected narcotic trafficker with USCGC Raymond Evans (WPC-1110).  Evans took possession of the contraband and the traffickers.  The recovered cocaine was estimated to be in excess of 970 kilograms.  After recovering the drugs, she continued on her shakedown cruise covered  over the course of 68 days before returning home.  

Stone was commissioned on 19 March 2021, in her homeport of North Charleston, S.C.

See also
 Integrated Deepwater System Program

References

External links

Legend-class cutters
Ships of the United States Coast Guard
2019 ships
Ships built in Pascagoula, Mississippi